Bamnet Narong station is a railway station located in Ban Phet Subdistrict, Bamnet Narong District, Chaiyaphum Province.

References 

Railway stations in Thailand
Chaiyaphum province